Hans Aaron Mensing (born 11 November 1997) is a Danish-German handball player for SG Flensburg-Handewitt and the Denmark men's national handball team. He played for the SG Flensburg-Handewitt youth teams until 12 years old.

Mensing was eligible to play international handball for both Germany and Denmark. He chose to represent Denmark and made his debut in April 2021.

Honours

Individual
Herre Handbold Ligaen All-Star team of the season 2020–2021

References 

Danish male handball players
German male handball players
1997 births
Living people
People from Sønderborg
Sportspeople from the Region of Southern Denmark